Thomas James Edwin Andrews (26 August 1890 – 28 January 1970) was an Australian cricketer who played in 16 Tests from 1921 to 1926.

See also 
List of cricketers called for throwing in top-class cricket matches in Australia
List of New South Wales representative cricketers

References

1890 births
1970 deaths
Australia Test cricketers
New South Wales cricketers
Australian cricketers
Cricketers from Sydney